North Powder is a city in Union County, Oregon, United States. The population was 439 at the 2010 census.

History
North Powder was platted in 1885 or 1886 along the Oregon Railroad and Navigation Company rail line, having been a stage stop before then.

David Eccles, a Mormon businessman, created the Hall Brothers Lumber Company in the town once the railway arrived.

North Powder prospered because it had an icehouse that supplied the refrigerator cars of Pacific Fruit Express until the icehouse burned down in the 1930s.

Geography

Climate
This region experiences warm (but not hot) and dry summers, with no average monthly temperatures above . According to the Köppen Climate Classification system, North Powder has a warm-summer Mediterranean climate, abbreviated "Csb" on climate maps.

Demographics

2010 census
As of the census of 2010, there were 439 people, 184 households, and 111 families living in the city. The racial makeup of the city was 92.5% White, 0.5% African American, 1.6% Native American, 0.5% Asian, 2.3% from other races, and 2.7% from two or more races. Hispanic or Latino of any race were 8.9% of the population.

There were 184 households, of which 27.2% had children under the age of 18 living with them, 50.5% were married couples living together, 7.6% had a female householder with no husband present, 2.2% had a male householder with no wife present, and 39.7% were non-families. 31.5% of all households were made up of individuals, and 10.9% had someone living alone who was 65 years of age or older. The average household size was 2.39 and the average family size was 3.10.

The median age in the city was 43.1 years. 26.4% of residents were under the age of 18; 3.7% were between the ages of 18 and 24; 21.2% were from 25 to 44; 31.4% were from 45 to 64; and 17.3% were 65 years of age or older. The gender makeup of the city was 48.1% male and 51.9% female.

2000 census
As of the census of 2000, there were 489 people, 184 households, and 130 families living in the city. The population density was 797.7 people per square mile (309.5/km). There were 209 housing units at an average density of 340.9 per square mile (132.3/km). The racial makeup of the city was 96.32% White, 0.61% African American, 0.61% Native American, 0.41% Asian, 0.20% Pacific Islander, and 1.84% from two or more races. Hispanic or Latino of any race were 3.07% of the population.

There were 184 households, out of which 32.1% had children under the age of 18 living with them, 56.5% were married couples living together, 9.2% had a female householder with no husband present, and 29.3% were non-families. 25.0% of all households were made up of individuals, and 10.9% had someone living alone who was 65 years of age or older. The average household size was 2.66 and the average family size was 3.11.

In the city, the population was spread out, with 30.3% under the age of 18, 5.1% from 18 to 24, 26.0% from 25 to 44, 22.3% from 45 to 64, and 16.4% who were 65 years of age or older. The median age was 39 years. For every 100 females, there were 97.2 males. For every 100 females age 18 and over, there were 93.8 males.

The median income for a household in the city was $24,167, and the median income for a family was $27,188. Males had a median income of $27,500 versus $19,063 for females. The per capita income for the city was $11,231. About 22.1% of families and 25.9% of the population were below the poverty line, including 39.6% of those under age 18 and 12.1% of those age 65 or over.

Notable people
Margaret Rayburn, educator, member of the Washington House of Representatives

References

External links
 Listing for North Powder in the Oregon Blue Book

1886 establishments in Oregon
Cities in Oregon
Cities in Union County, Oregon
Populated places established in 1886